The Bangladesh national cricket team played three One Day International (ODI) matches in Australia in 2008, under the captaincy of Mohammad Ashraful. The Australians, captained by Michael Clarke, comfortably swept the series 3–0.

The series was during the southern Australian winter, therefore the matches were played in northern Australia at Marrara Oval, Darwin. On slow, low, continental-like pitches, Bangladesh failed to score more than 125 in the series. Australian Shaun Marsh was the leading run-scorer for the series, with 175 runs. Australia's Mitchell Johnson finished leading wicket-taker for the series—with six wickets—ahead of teammates Cameron White and Stuart Clark. Michael Hussey was named man of the series as the Australian's dominated every facet of the series.

ODI series

1st ODI

2nd ODI

3rd ODI

Tour Matches

Australian Institute of Sport v Bangladeshis

Australian Institute of Sport v Bangladeshis

Australian Institute of Sport v Bangladeshis

Australian Institute of Sport v Bangladeshis

Northern Territory Chief Minister's XI v Bangladeshis

References

Bangladesh
Australia
2008
Bangladesh in Australia